Marcus Wilson Jernegan (1872–1949) was an American historian and a professor at the University of Chicago. In 2017, a scholar from Harvard (Donald Yacovone) referred to him as one of the leading historians of his time who influenced textbooks of his era and noted the tainted and bigoted sources he relied on.

Biography
He was from Edgartown, Massachusetts, and graduated as valedictorian of Edgartown High School. He received his PhD from the University of Chicago in 1906. His father was a whaler and his brother, Prescott Jernegan, became infamous as the promoter of the fraudulent Jernegan Process for extracting gold from seawater.

He was part of a pioneering effort to map colonial churches. He wrote about slavery and conversion to Christianity in the United States. He also wrote about the veracity of Benjamin Franklin's supposed experiments with a kite to demonstrate electricity.

Jernegan collected specimens of algae.

Legacy
A collection of essays written by his students was published as a historiography in 1937.

Selected publications
The American Colonies — 1492 to 1750
A Child’s Diary Aboard a Whale-ship (edited version of his sister's diaries)
The History of the Whaling Industry

References

1872 births
1949 deaths
University of Chicago faculty
People from Edgartown, Massachusetts
University of Chicago alumni
20th-century American historians
20th-century American male writers
Historians from Massachusetts
American male non-fiction writers